In the Movies is a 2007 album by Ice Cube.  It is a compilation of tracks that have appeared in movies from 1991 with Boyz n the Hood to 2005 with xXx: State of the Union. It was released on September 4, 2007 and in Australia on September 24, 2007. The album was confused for a studio album prior to the release of the track listing. This album has guest appearances from Mack 10, Ms. Toi, Dr. Dre, Master P, Mr. Short Khop and Ice-T. The album's artwork is cinema-reel themed and actual images of Ice Cube are similar to those in Laugh Now, Cry Later.

Track listing

Charts

References

Ice Cube albums
2007 compilation albums
Gangsta rap compilation albums
Priority Records compilation albums